is a passenger railway station in located in the city of  Tsu, Mie Prefecture, Japan, operated by Central Japan Railway Company (JR Tōkai).

Lines
Ise-Okitsu Station is served by the Meishō Line, and is 43.5 rail kilometers from the terminus of the line at Matsusaka Station.

Station layout
The station consists of a single side platform serving one bi-directional track.

Adjacent stations

History 
Ise-Okitsu Station was opened on December 5, 1935 as a station on the Japanese Government Railways (JGR) (which became the Japan National Railways (JNR) after World War II). Freight services were suspended from October 1965. The station has been unattended since April 1, 1986. Along with the division and privatization of JNR on April 1, 1987, the station came under the control and operation of the Central Japan Railway Company. The station has been unattended since 1990. The station building was rebuilt in 2005.

Between October 8, 2009 and March 26, 2016, the section between this station and Ieki Station was closed due to damage from Typhoon Melor. During this time, a bus line served this section of the line.

Passenger statistics
In fiscal 2019, the station was used by an average of 26 passengers daily (boarding passengers only).

Surrounding area
Tsu City Yawata Branch Office / Yawata Community Resident Center (within station building)
Tsu City Ise-Okitsu Station Tourist Information Exchange Facility (Adjacent to station building)
Hachiman Shrine (Shrine related to Kitabatake Akiyoshi, Registered tangible cultural property of Mie Prefecture)
Kitabatake Shrine

See also
 List of railway stations in Japan

References

External links

JR Central home page

Railway stations in Japan opened in 1935
Railway stations in Mie Prefecture
Tsu, Mie